"Here I Go Again" is a song by UK pop group Guys 'n' Dolls from their eponymous debut LP. The song was written by the songwriting team of Chris Arnold, David Martin, and Geoff Morrow.  It became a top 40 hit for the group in the United Kingdom in the spring of 1975.

Larry Evoy cover
"Here I Go Again" was recorded in 1977 by former Edward Bear lead singer Larry Evoy.  The single was issued from his eponymous debut LP, which was his only album.  

The song became a hit in his home nation of Canada during the spring of 1978, reaching number 55.  It was a bigger Adult Contemporary hit, reaching number 17.

The song was included on the 1984 Edward Bear compilation LP, The Best of the Bear.

Chart history
Guys 'n' Dolls

Larry Evoy

References

External links
 

1975 songs
1975 singles
1977 singles
Songs written by Geoff Morrow
Guys 'n' Dolls songs
Ariola Records singles